McFaul is a surname. Notable people with the surname include:

 Michael McFaul, (born 1963 in Glasgow, Montana) is a Stanford University professor and former United States Ambassador to Russia. He worked for the U.S. National Security Council as Special Assistant to the President and Senior Director of Russian and Eurasian Affairs.
 Donald L. McFaul (1957-1989), US Navy SEAL killed in action in Panama
 Iam "Willie" McFaul (born 1943), professional football player and coach
 Shane McFaul (born 1986), professional football player

See also
 USS McFaul, Arleigh Burke-class destroyer in the United States Navy, named for Donald McFaul